The 1st constituency of Eure is a French legislative constituency in Eure.

Historic representation

Election results

2022

 
 
 
 
 
 
 
 
|-
| colspan="8" bgcolor="#E9E9E9"|
|-

2017

2012

References

External links 
Results of legislative elections since 1958

French legislative constituencies of Eure